The women's 3x2.5 km relay open cross-country skiing competition at the 2006 Winter Paralympics was held on 17 March at Pragelato.

The event was won by the team representing .

Results

Team Lists

References

W
Para